Letheobia wittei, also known commonly as De Witte's gracile blind snake or Witte's beaked snake, is a species of snake in the family Typhlopidae. The species is endemic to Africa.

Etymology
The specific name, wittei, is in honor of Belgian herpetologist Gaston-François de Witte.

Habitat
The preferred natural habitat of L. wittei is lowland rainforest.

Reproduction
L. wittei is oviparous.

References

Further reading
Broadley DG, Wallach V (2007). "A review of East and Central African species of Letheobia Cope, revived from the synonymy of Rhinotyphlops Fitzinger, with descriptions of five new species (Serpentes: Typhlopidae)". Zootaxa 1515: 31–68. (Letheobia wittei, p. 48).
Hedges SB, Marion AB, Lipp KM, Marin J, Vidal N (2014). "A taxonomic framework for typhlopid snakes from the Caribbean and other regions (Reptilia, Squamata)". Caribbean Herpetology 49: 1–61. (Letheobia wittei, p. 30).
Roux-Estève, Rolande (1974). "Révision systématique des Typhlopidae d'Afrique. Reptilia. Serpentes ". Mémoires du Muséum National d'Histoire Naturelle, Paris, Séries A, 87: 1–313. (Rhinotyphlops wittei, new species, p. 239). (in French).

Letheobia
Reptiles described in 1974
Endemic fauna of the Democratic Republic of the Congo